Smoke Rise may refer to:
 Smoke Rise, Alabama, location in Blount County, Alabama, USA
 Smoke Rise (band), American progressive rock band
 Smoke Rise (community), gated community in Kinnelon, New Jersey, USA
 Smoke Rise, Georgia, a suburb of Atlanta, GA